Brad King (born Jack Oliver Watt, November 23, 1917 -  November 1, 1991) was an American actor. He is best known for briefly playing Hopalong Cassidy's sidekick, Johnny Nelson, in five of the Hoppy films. He was drafted into the U.S. Army in 1941 before he could complete his sixth Cassidy film.

King was born on a ranch in Lander County, Nevada. After his father's death and his mother's remarriage, the family moved to a ranch in Bountiful, Utah. At age 20, he worked as wagon boss for a ranch in Nye County, Nevada. He also won prizes in rodeo competition.

Filmography 
 Trouble at Melody Mesa (1949)
 Pistol Packin' Nitwits (1945)
 Secret of the Wastelands (1941)
 Outlaws of the Desert (1941)
 Twilight on the Trail (1941)
 Riders of the Timberline (1941)
 Stick to Your Guns (1941)

References

External links

1917 births
1991 deaths
20th-century American male actors
American male film actors
Male Western (genre) film actors